Sharzhenga is a rural locality (a settlement) in Zelentsovskoye Rural Settlement, Nikolsky District, Vologda Oblast, Russia. The population was 146 as of 2010.

Geography 
Sharzhenga is located 68 km northwest of Nikolsk (the district's administrative centre) by road. Shirokaya is the nearest rural locality.

References 

Rural localities in Nikolsky District, Vologda Oblast